Mount Leidy is a summit in Teton County, Wyoming, in the United States.

The mountain was named for Joseph Leidy, an American paleontologist.

References

Leidy
Leidy